The Hill Farm is a historic farmhouse in rural White County, Arkansas.  It is located on the east side of County Road 6, just southwest of the Beebe city limits.  It is a single story wood-frame structure, with a side gable roof, and a porch across the front and rear with a shed roof supported by square box columns. Built in 1928, it is a well-preserved example of a Craftsman house in a rural setting.

The house was listed on the National Register of Historic Places in 1992.

See also
National Register of Historic Places listings in White County, Arkansas

References

Houses on the National Register of Historic Places in Arkansas
Houses completed in 1928
Houses in White County, Arkansas
National Register of Historic Places in White County, Arkansas
Buildings and structures in Beebe, Arkansas